Vitaliy Pavlov (born 21 August 1965) is a Soviet and Ukrainian football manager and former player.

Career
Pavlov spent a big part of his career in Belarus and currently holds Belarusian citizenship. Since 2010, he has been working as Belshina Bobruisk assistant coach. In 2012, he briefly acted as a caretaker manager. In January 2016, he was appointed as team's permanent head coach, although just 8 days later he was replaced by new coach Vladimir Yezhurov due to change in Belshina management. He was once again appointed as team's head coach in July 2016.

References

External links
 Profile at Belshina website
 

1965 births
Living people
Soviet footballers
Ukrainian footballers
Association football midfielders
Ukrainian expatriate footballers
Expatriate footballers in Belarus
Expatriate footballers in Bulgaria
Expatriate footballers in Finland
FC Polissya Zhytomyr players
FC Zirka Berdychiv players
FC Slavyansk Slavyansk-na-Kubani players
FC Arda Kardzhali players
FC Fandok Bobruisk players
FC Dnepr Rogachev players
FC Rechitsa-2014 players
FC Osipovichi players
Atlantis FC players
Belarusian football managers
FC Vedrich-97 Rechitsa managers
FC Slavia Mozyr managers
FC Belshina Bobruisk managers
FC Slutsk managers